Parshall (Hidatsa: dibiarugareesh) is a city lying within the jurisdictional boundaries of the Mandan, Hidatsa, and Arikara Nation. It is located on the Fort Berthold Indian Reservation in Mountrail County, North Dakota, United States. The population was 949 at the 2020 census. Parshall was founded in 1914 by George Parshall, and is the home of the Paul Broste Rock Museum.

On February 15, 1936, Parshall recorded a temperature of -60 °F (-51 °C), setting a state record low temperature, which still stands today.  Relatively nearby Steele, ND recorded a state record high of 121 °F (49 °C) less than five months later.

During the calendar year 1934, in the midst of the severe multi-year drought that affected most of North America during much of the 1930s, Parshall recorded a total of 4.02 in (101 mm) of precipitation, less than 12 per cent of the long-term normal and much drier than is normally the case in much of the Sonoran Desert.

Randy Hedberg, a former NFL quarterback, was born and raised in Parshall. Another notable native of Parshall is Raymond Cross, a stand out high school basketball player and now a law professor in Montana.

Geography
Parshall is located at  (47.954806, -102.134513).

Demographics

2010 census
As of the census of 2010, there were 903 people, 313 households, and 220 families residing in the city. The racial makeup of the city was 30.6% White, 0.3% African American, 62.7% Native American, 0.7% from other races, and 5.8% from two or more races. Hispanic or Latino of any race were 6.5% of the population.

There were 313 households, of which 44.1% had children under the age of 18 living with them, 38.7% were married couples living together, 22.0% had a female householder with no husband present, 9.6% had a male householder with no wife present, and 29.7% were non-families. 24.3% of all households were made up of individuals, and 7.3% had someone living alone who was 65 years of age or older. The average household size was 2.86 and the average family size was 3.41.

The median age in the city was 31.6 years. 32.2% of residents were under the age of 18; 10.2% were between the ages of 18 and 24; 23.2% were from 25 to 44; 25.6% were from 45 to 64; and 9% were 65 years of age or older. The gender makeup of the city was 49.8% male and 50.2% female.

2000 census
As of the census of 2000, there were 981 people, 339 households, and 240 families residing in the city. The population density was 1,803.4 people per square mile (701.4/km). There were 392 housing units at an average density of 720.6 per square mile (280.3/km). The racial makeup of the city was 41.79% White, 0.31% African American, 54.54% Native American, 1.22% from other races, and 2.14% from two or more races. Hispanic or Latino of any race were 3.26% of the population.

There were 339 households, out of which 39.5% had children under the age of 18 living with them, 39.2% were married couples living together, 25.4% had a female householder with no husband present, and 29.2% were non-families. 26.3% of all households were made up of individuals, and 15.6% had someone living alone who was 65 years of age or older. The average household size was 2.75 and the average family size was 3.23.

In the city, the population was spread out, with 33.1% under the age of 18, 8.3% from 18 to 24, 23.4% from 25 to 44, 16.8% from 45 to 64, and 18.3% who were 65 years of age or older. The median age was 33 years. For every 100 females, there were 91.2 males. For every 100 females age 18 and over, there were 84.8 males.

The median income for a household in the city was $24,500, and the median income for a family was $27,222. Males had a median income of $23,558 versus $21,750 for females. The per capita income for the city was $11,459. About 21.6% of families and 27.7% of the population were below the poverty line, including 35.6% of those under age 18 and 20.3% of those age 65 or over.

Education

There are two schools in Parshall operated by Parshall Public Schools, the public elementary school and the public high school.

Demography
Along with White Shield, North Dakota, Parshall is home to speakers of the Arikara language.

Oil development

Parshall is, perhaps, best known nationally for its namesake Parshall Oil Field, which surrounds the town. The 2006 discovery of the Parshall Field started the North Dakota oil boom.

Aspects of the oil boom near Parshall were presented in the series Boomtown on Discovery Communications cable channel Planet Green.

Climate
This climatic region is typified by large seasonal temperature differences, with warm to hot (and often humid) summers and cold (sometimes severely cold) winters.  According to the Köppen Climate Classification system, Parshall has a humid continental climate, abbreviated "Dfb" on climate maps.

References

External links
 Inn official website
 City of Parshall official website
 Paul Broste Rock Museum website
 Parshall High School website
 Boomtown, Planet Green
50th anniversary, 1913-1963 : the First Congregational United Church of Christ of Parshall, North Dakota from the Digital Horizons website

Cities in Mountrail County, North Dakota
Cities in North Dakota
Populated places established in 1914
1914 establishments in North Dakota
Mandan, Hidatsa, and Arikara Nation